Yuriy Fedechko (born 15 August 1992) is a Ukrainian modern pentathlete. He competed at the 2010 Summer Youth Olympics where he was 12th in individual competition. He is 2015 European champion in men's relay and 2018 European bronze medalist in men's team competition.

References

External links

1992 births
Living people
Ukrainian male modern pentathletes
Modern pentathletes at the 2010 Summer Youth Olympics
World Modern Pentathlon Championships medalists
21st-century Ukrainian people